Plailly is a commune in the Oise department of northern France. 

It is best known as the home of the Parc Astérix theme park, which opened on 30 April 1989.

See also
 Parc Astérix
 Communes of the Oise department

References

Communes of Oise